UFC Apex (stylised as UFC APEX) is a live events and production center in Enterprise, Nevada, operated and owned by the Ultimate Fighting Championship (UFC). The facility was chosen in part due to its close proximity to the UFC Performance Institute, which serves as the company headquarters and is located across the street. The Apex was built to host live events as well as studio shows.

History 
The facility was officially opened on June 18, 2019. In the wake of the COVID-19 pandemic, following three events in Jacksonville, all U.S.-based UFC events were held at the Apex behind closed doors. As of July 2022, the Apex continues to host select Fight Night events, and now allows for limited public spectators. The Apex features the 25-foot diameter Octagon variant typically used for smaller events and venues, as opposed to the standard 30-foot diameter version. As UFC began staging the majority of its events at the Apex, early fight data and fan speculation suggested that the use of the smaller Octagon resulted in higher-volume and faster-pace striking fights, along with more finishes.

In late January of 2022, there was an article from the Las Vegas Review-Journal stating the UFC Apex plans to expand seating up to 1,000 people, adding food / alcohol service, ticket sales, souvenir shop, along with adding extra parking.

Events

Scheduled events

Past events

See also 
 UFC Performance Institute

References 

Ultimate Fighting Championship
2019 establishments in Nevada
Mixed martial arts venues in Nevada
Boxing venues in Las Vegas
Sports venues in Las Vegas
Sports venues completed in 2019